2010 was a pivotal moment in Iraqi Football History. They beat teams such as Saudi Arabia and came close against Iran. The Overall record for the Iraqis in 2010 was 8-5-3.

National Team

Friendly Matches

2010 West Asian Football Federation Championship

20th Arabian Gulf Cup

External links
iraq-football.net/ 
iraqfc.webs.com/